Lispe is a genus of true flies, belonging to the family Muscidae.

The adult are predators of small insects. Larvae are also predators, living in damp sand and mud.

See also
 List of Lispe species

References

Muscidae
Diptera of Europe
Articles containing video clips
Brachycera genera
Taxa named by Pierre André Latreille